Ascaltis reticulum is a species of sea sponge the family Leucascidae.  Like all sponges, it is a filter-feeder.

References

Clathrinidae
Sponges described in 1862
Taxa named by Eduard Oscar Schmidt